Jack Winchester (born 22 June 2000 in Australia) is an Australian rugby union player who plays for the  in Super Rugby. His playing position is hooker. He was named in the Force squad for the 2021 Super Rugby AU season.

Reference list

External links
Rugby.com.au profile
itsrugby.co.uk profile

2000 births
Australian rugby union players
Living people
Rugby union hookers
Western Force players
Rugby union players from Sydney